Milestones is a 1920 American silent historical drama film directed by Paul Scardon and starring Lewis Stone, Alice Hollister, and Gertrude Robinson. It is an adaptation of the 1912 West End play Milestones by Arnold Bennett and Edward Knoblock. It is a saga of a British upper-class family from the 1860s to the present.

Cast

Preservation
With no copies of Milestones located in any film archives, it is a lost film.

References

Bibliography
 Goble, Alan. The Complete Index to Literary Sources in Film. Walter de Gruyter, 1999.

External links

}

1920 films
American silent feature films
American black-and-white films
Goldwyn Pictures films
Films directed by Paul Scardon
American films based on plays
1920s historical drama films
American historical drama films
Films set in the 1860s
Films set in the 1880s
Films set in London
1920 drama films
1920s English-language films
1920s American films
Silent American drama films